An X-ray astronomy satellite studies X-ray emissions from celestial objects, as part of a branch of space science known as X-ray astronomy. Satellites are needed because X-radiation is absorbed by the Earth's atmosphere, so instruments to detect X-rays must be taken to high altitude by balloons, sounding rockets, and satellites.

A detector is placed on a satellite which is then put into orbit well above the Earth's atmosphere. Unlike balloons, instruments on satellites are able to observe the full range of the X-ray spectrum. Unlike sounding rockets, they can collect data for as long as the instruments continue to operate. For example, the Chandra X-ray Observatory has been operational for more than twenty one years.

Active X-ray observatory satellites
Satellites in use today include the XMM-Newton observatory (low to mid energy X-rays 0.1-15 keV) and the INTEGRAL satellite (high energy X-rays 15-60 keV). Both were launched by the European Space Agency. NASA has launched the Swift and Chandra observatories. One of the instruments on Swift is the Swift X-Ray Telescope (XRT).

The GOES 14 spacecraft carries on board a Solar X-ray Imager to monitor the Sun's X-rays for the early detection of solar flares, coronal mass ejections, and other phenomena that impact the geospace environment. It was launched into orbit on June 27, 2009, at 22:51 GMT from Space Launch Complex 37B at the Cape Canaveral Air Force Station.

On January 30, 2009, the Russian Federal Space Agency successfully launched the Koronas-Foton which carries several experiments to detect X-rays, including the TESIS telescope/spectrometer FIAN with SphinX soft X-ray spectrophotometer.

ISRO launched the multi-wavelength space observatory Astrosat in 2015. One of the unique features of ASTROSAT mission is that it enables the simultaneous multi-wavelength observations of various astronomical objects with a single satellite. ASTROSAT observes universe in the optical, Ultraviolet, low and high energy X-ray regions of the electromagnetic spectrum, whereas most other scientific satellites are capable of observing a narrow range of wavelength band.

The Italian Space Agency (ASI) gamma-ray observatory satellite Astro-rivelatore Gamma ad Imagini Leggero (AGILE) has on board the Super-AGILE 15-45 keV hard X-ray detector. It was launched on April 23, 2007, by the Indian PSLV-C8.

The Hard X-ray Modulation Telescope (HXMT) is a Chinese X-ray space observatory, launched on June 15, 2017 to observe black holes, neutron stars, active galactic nuclei and other phenomena based on their X-ray and gamma-ray emissions.

The 'Lobster-Eye X-ray Satellite' was launched on 25 July 2020 by CNSA. it is the first in-orbit telescope to utilize the Lobster-Eye imaging technology of ultra-large field of view imaging to search for dark matter signals in the x-ray energy range.

A soft X-ray solar imaging telescope is on board the GOES-13 weather satellite launched using a Delta IV from Cape Canaveral LC37B on May 24, 2006. However, there have been no GOES 13 SXI images since December 2006.

Although the Suzaku X-ray spectrometer (the first micro-calorimeter in space) failed on August 8, 2005, after launch on July 10, 2005, the X-ray Imaging Spectrometer (XIS) and Hard X-ray Detector (HXD) are still functioning.

The Russian-German Spektr-RG carries the eROSITA telescope array as well as the ART-XC telescope. It was launched by Roscosmos on 13 July 2019 from Baikonur and began collecting data in October 2019.

The Solar Orbiter (SOLO) will approach to 62 solar radii to view the solar atmosphere with high spatial resolution in visible, XUV, and X-rays. The nominally 6 yr mission will be from an elliptical orbit around the Sun with perihelion as low as 0.28 AU and with increasing inclination (using gravity assists from Venus) up to more than 30° with respect to the solar equator. The Orbiter will deliver images and data from the polar regions and the side of the Sun not visible from Earth. It launched in February 2020.

Past X-ray observatory satellites

Past observatories include SMART-1, which contained an X-ray telescope for mapping lunar X-ray fluorescence, ROSAT, the Einstein Observatory (the first fully imaging X-ray telescope), the ASCA observatory, EXOSAT, and BeppoSAX. Uhuru was the first satellite launched specifically for the purpose of X-ray astronomy. Copernicus which carried an X-ray detector built by University College London's Mullard Space Science Laboratory made extensive X-ray observations. ANS could measure X-ray photons in the energy range 2 to 30 keV. Ariel 5 was dedicated to observing the sky in the X-ray band. HEAO-1 scanned the X-ray sky over 0.2 keV - 10 MeV. Hakucho was Japan's first X-ray astronomy satellite. ISRO's IRS-P3 launched in 1996 with the Indian X-ray Astronomy Experiment (IXAE) on board which  aimed to study the time variability and spectral characteristics of cosmic X-ray sources and for detection of transient X-ray sources. IXAE instruments consisted of three identical pointed mode proportional counters (PPCs) operated in the energy range 2-20 keV, FOV of 2° x 2° and effective area of 1200 cm2, and an X-ray sky monitor (XSM) operating in the energy range 2-10 keV.

Array of low-energy X-ray imaging sensors
The Array of Low Energy X-ray Imaging Sensors (ALEXIS) featured curved mirrors whose multilayer coatings reflect and focus low-energy X-rays or extreme ultraviolet light the way optical telescopes focus visible light. The launch of ALEXIS was provided by the United States Air Force Space Test Program on a Pegasus Booster on April 25, 1993. The spacing of the molybdenum (Mo) and silicon (Si) layers on each telescope's mirror is the primary determinant of the telescope's photon energy response function. ALEXIS operated for 12 yr.

OSO-3

The third Orbiting Solar Observatory (OSO 3) was launched on March 8, 1967, into a nearly circular orbit of mean altitude 550 km, inclined at 33° to the equatorial plane, deactivated on June 28, 1968, followed by reentry on April 4, 1982. Its XRT consisted of a continuously spinning wheel (1.7 s period) in which the hard X-ray experiment was mounted with a radial view. The XRT assembly was a single thin NaI(Tl) scintillation crystal plus phototube enclosed in a howitzer-shaped CsI(Tl) anti-coincidence shield. The energy resolution was 45% at 30 keV. The instrument operated from 7.7 to 210 keV with 6 channels. OSO-3 obtained extensive observations of solar flares, the diffuse component of cosmic X-rays, and the observation of a single flare episode from Scorpius X-1, the first observation of an extrasolar X-ray source by an observatory satellite. Among the extrasolar X-ray sources OSO 3 observed were UV Ceti, YZ Canis Minoris, EV Lacertae and AD Leonis, yielding upper soft X-ray detection limits on flares from these sources.

ESRO 2B (Iris)

ESRO 2B (Iris) was the first successful ESRO satellite launch. Iris was launched on May 17, 1968, had an elliptical orbit with (initially) apogee 1086 km, perigee 326 km, and inclination 97.2°, with an orbital period of 98.9 minutes. The satellite carried seven instruments to detect high energy cosmic rays, determine the total flux of solar X-rays, and measure trapped radiation, Van Allen belt protons and cosmic ray protons. Of special significance for X-ray astronomy were two X-ray instruments: one designed to detect wavelengths 1-20 Å (0.1-2 nm) (consisting of proportional counters with varying window thickness) and one designed to detect wavelengths 44-60 Å (4.4-6.0 nm) (consisting of proportional counters with thin Mylar windows).

Wavelength dispersive X-ray spectroscopy (WDS) is a method used to count the number of X-rays of a specific wavelength diffracted by a crystal. WDS only counts X-rays of a single wavelength or wavelength band. In order to interpret the data, the expected elemental wavelength peak locations need to be known. For the ESRO-2B WDS X-ray instruments, calculations of the expected solar spectrum had to be performed and were compared to peaks detected by rocket measurements.

Other X-ray detecting satellites

The SOLar RADiation satellite program (SOLRAD) was conceived in the late 1950s to study the Sun's effects on Earth, particularly during periods of heightened solar activity. Solrad 1 is launched on June 22, 1960, aboard a Thor Able from Cape Canaveral at 1:54 a.m. EDT. As the world's first orbiting astronomical observatory, Solrad 1 determined that radio fade-outs were caused by solar X-ray emissions.
The first in a series of 8 successfully launched Orbiting Solar Observatories (OSO 1, launched on March 7, 1963) had as its primary mission to measure solar electromagnetic radiation in the UV, X-ray, and gamma-ray regions.
OGO 1, the first of the Orbiting Geophysical Observatories (OGOs), was successfully launched from Cape Kennedy on September 5, 1964, and placed into an initial orbit of 281 × 149,385 km at 31° inclination. A secondary objective was to detect gamma-ray bursts from the Sun in the energy range 80 keV - 1 MeV. The experiment consisted of 3 CsI crystals surrounded by a plastic anti-coincidence shield. Once every 18.5 seconds, integral intensity measurements were made in each of 16 energy channels which were equally spaced over the 0.08-1 MeV range. OGO 1 was completely terminated on November 1, 1971. Although the satellite did not achieve its goals due to electrical interference and secular degradation, searching back through the data after the discovery of cosmic gamma-ray bursts by the Vela satellites revealed the detection of one or more such events in the OGO 1 data.
Solar X-ray bursts were observed by OSO 2 and an effort was made to map the entire celestial sphere for direction and intensity of X-radiation.

The first USA satellite which detected cosmic X-rays was the third Orbiting Solar Observatory, or OSO-3, launched on March 8, 1967. It was intended primarily to observe the Sun, which it did very well during its 2-year lifetime, but it also detected a flaring episode from the source Sco X-1 and measured the diffuse cosmic X-ray background.
The fourth successful Orbiting Solar Observatory, OSO 4, was launched on October 18, 1967. The objectives of the OSO 4 satellite were to perform solar physics experiments above the atmosphere and to measure the direction and intensity over the entire celestial sphere in UV, X, and gamma radiation. The OSO 4 platform consisted of a sail section (which pointed 2 instruments continuously toward the Sun) and a wheel section which spun about an axis perpendicular to the pointing direction of the sail (which contained 7 experiments). The spacecraft performed normally until a second tape recorder failed in May 1968. OSO 4 was put into a "standby" mode in November 1969. It could be turned on only for recording special events in real-time. One such event occurred on March 7, 1970, during a solar eclipse. The spacecraft became totally inoperable on December 7, 1971.
OGO 5 was launched on March 4, 1968. The satellite, primarily devoted to Earth observation, was in a highly elliptical initial orbit with a 272 km perigee and a 148,228 km apogee. The orbital inclination was 31.1°. The satellite took 3796 minutes to complete one orbit. The Energetic Radiations from Solar Flares experiment was operational from March 1968 - June 1971. Primarily devoted to solar observations, it detected at least 11 cosmic X-ray bursts in time coincidence with gamma-ray bursts seen by other instruments. The detector was a 0.5 cm thick NaI(Tl) crystal with a 9.5 cm2 area. Data were accumulated into energy ranges of: 9.6-19.2, 19.2-32, 32-48, 48-64, 64-80, 80-104, 104-128, and > 128 keV. The data were sampled for 1.15 seconds once every 2.3 seconds.
Cosmos 215 was launched April 19, 1968 and contained an X-ray experiment. Orbit characteristics: 261 × 426 km, at an inclination of 48.5°. The orbital period was ~ 91 minutes. It was intended primarily to perform solar studies, but did detect some non-solar X-ray events. It reentered the atmosphere on June 30, 1968.
The Soviet Union's Intercosmos series began in 1969.
OSO 5 was launched on January 22, 1969, and lasted until July 1975. It was the 5th satellite put into orbit as part of the Orbiting Solar Observatory program. This program was intended to launch a series of nearly identical satellites to cover an entire 11-year solar cycle. The circular orbit had an altitude of 555 km and an inclination of 33°. The spin rate of the satellite was 1.8 s. The data produced a spectrum of the diffuse background over the energy range 14-200 keV.
OSO 6 was launched on August 9, 1969. Its orbital period was ~95 min. The spacecraft had a spin rate of 0.5 rps. On board was a hard X-ray detector (27-189 keV) with a 5.1 cm2 NaI(Tl) scintillator, collimated to 17° × 23° FWHM. The system had 4 energy channels (separated 27-49-75-118-189 keV). The detector spun with the spacecraft on a plane containing the Sun direction within ± 3.5°. Data were read with alternate 70 ms and 30 ms integrations for 5 intervals every 320 ms.

The Vela satellites 5A and 5B, launched on May 23, 1969, are responsible for significant discoveries of gamma-ray bursts and astronomical X-ray sources including V 0332+53.
Like the previous Vela 5 satellites, the Vela 6 nuclear test detection satellites were part of a program run jointly by the Advanced Research Projects of the U. S. Department of Defense and the U. S. Atomic Energy Commission, managed by the U. S. Air Force. The twin spacecraft, Vela 6A and 6B, were launched on April 8, 1970. Data from the Vela 6 satellites were used to look for correlations between gamma-ray bursts and X-ray events. At least 2 good candidates were found, GB720514 and GB740723. The X-ray detectors failed on Vela 6A on March 12, 1972, and on Vela 6B on January 27, 1972.
Cosmos 428 was launched by the USSR into Earth orbit on June 24, 1971, and recovered July 6, 1971. The orbit characteristics: apogee/perigee/inclination 208 km, 271 km, and 51.8°, respectively. It was a military satellite on which X-ray astronomy experiments had been added. There was a scintillation spectrometer sensitive to X-rays >30 keV, with a 2° × 17° field of view. In addition, there was an X-ray telescope which operated in the range 2-30 keV. Cosmos 428 detected several X-ray sources which were correlated to already identified Uhuru point sources.
Following on the success of Uhuru (SAS 1), NASA launched the Second Small Astronomy Satellite SAS 2. It was launched from the San Marco platform off the coast of Kenya, Africa, into a nearly equatorial orbit.

TD-1A was put in a nearly circular polar sun-synchronous orbit, with apogee 545 km, perigee 533 km, and inclination 97.6°. It was ESRO's first 3-axis stabilized satellite, with one axis pointing to the Sun to within ±5°. The optical axis was maintained perpendicular to the solar pointing axis and to the orbital plane. It scanned the entire celestial sphere every 6 months, with a great circle being scanned every satellite revolution. After about 2 months of operation, both of the satellite's tape recorders failed. A network of ground stations was put together so that real-time telemetry from the satellite was recorded for about 60% of the time. After 6 months in orbit, the satellite entered a period of regular eclipses as the satellite passed behind the Earth—cutting off sunlight to the solar panels. The satellite was put into hibernation for 4 months, until the eclipse period passed, after which systems were turned back on and another 6 months of observations were made. TD-1A was primarily a UV mission however it carried both a cosmic X-ray and a gamma-ray detector. TD-1A reentered on January 9, 1980.
To continue the intensive X-ray investigation of the Sun and the cosmic X-ray background, OSO 7 was launched on September 29, 1971. OSO 7 made the first observation of solar gamma-ray line emission, due to electron/positron annihilation at 511 keV, from a solar flare in April 1972.
To conduct experiments in X-ray astronomy and solar physics among others the Indian Space Research Organization (ISRO) built Aryabhata. It was launched by the Soviet Union on April 19, 1975, from Kapustin Yar. A power failure halted experiments after 4 days in orbit.
The third US Small Astronomy Satellite (SAS-3) was launched on May 7, 1975, with 3 major scientific objectives: 1) determine bright X-ray source locations to an accuracy of 15 arcseconds; 2) study selected sources over the energy range 0.1-55 keV; and 3) continuously search the sky for X-ray novae, flares, and other transient phenomena. It was a spinning satellite with pointing capability. SAS 3 was the first to discover X-rays from a highly magnetic WD binary system, AM Her, discovered X-rays from Algol and HZ 43, and surveyed the soft X-ray background (0.1-0.28 keV).
Orbiting Solar Observatory (OSO 8) was launched on June 21, 1975. While OSO 8's primary objective was to observe the Sun, four instruments were dedicated to observations of other celestial X-ray sources brighter than a few milliCrab. A sensitivity of 0.001 of the Crab nebula source (= 1 "mCrab"). OSO 8 ceased operations on October 1, 1978.

Signe 3 (launched on June 17, 1977) was part of the Soviet Union's Intercosmos program.
Bhaskara was the second Indian Space Research Organization (ISRO) satellite. It was launched on June 7, 1979, with a modified SS-5 Skean IRBM plus upper stage from Kapustin Yar in the Soviet Union. A secondary objective was to conduct X-ray astronomy investigations. Bhaskara 2 was launched on November 20, 1981, from Kapustin Yar like its predecessor also in size, mass and design may have conducted X-ray astronomy investigations.
On March 23, 1983, at 12:45:06 UTC, the Astron spacecraft is launched into an orbit around the Earth with an apogee of 185,000 km allowing it to make observations with an onboard X-ray spectroscope outside the Earth's umbra and radiation belt. Observations of Hercules X-1 are made from 1983 to 1987 in both the prolonged low state ("off" state) and "high on" state.

 
The Global Geospace Science (GGS) Polar Satellite was a NASA science spacecraft launched at 06:23:59.997 EST on February 24, 1996, aboard a McDonnell Douglas Delta II 7925-10 rocket from launch pad 2W at Vandenberg Air Force Base in Lompoc, California, to observe the Earth's polar magnetosphere. Polar is in a highly elliptical orbit, at an 86° inclination with an orbital period of ~18 hrs.  It gathers multi-wavelength imaging (including X-ray) of the aurora, and measures the entry of plasma into the polar magnetosphere and the geomagnetic tail, the flow of plasma to and from the ionosphere, and the deposition of particle energy in the ionosphere and upper atmosphere. Polar Mission Operations were terminated at 14:54:41 EDT on April 28, 2008.

A later satellite of the Intercosmos series, Intercosmos 26, (launched on March 2, 1994) as part of the Coronas-I international project may have conducted X-ray studies of the Sun.
Hitomi, formerly known as Astro-H, was a Japanese satellite which attempted to re-fly the microcalorimeter that failed on the Suzaku mission, along with hard-X-ray and soft-gamma instruments. It launched successfully on February 17, 2016.  However, spacecraft controllers lost communications with Hitomi on March 26, and declared the spacecraft lost April 28.

Proposed (future) X-ray observatory satellites

ATHENA
Advanced Telescope for High Energy Astrophysics was selected in 2013 as a second large mission of the Cosmic Vision programme. It will be one hundred times more sensitive than the best of existing X-ray telescopes.

Astro-H2
In July 2016 there were discussions between JAXA and NASA on launching a satellite to replace the Hitomi telescope lost in 2016. Astro-H2, also known as XRISM, is set to launch in 2022.

International X-ray Observatory
International X-ray Observatory (IXO) was a cancelled observatory. A result of the merging of NASA's Constellation-X and ESA/JAXA's XEUS mission concepts, it was planned to feature a single large X-ray mirror with a 3 m2 collecting area and 5" angular resolution, and a suite of instrumentation, including a wide field imaging detector, a hard X-ray imaging detector, a high-spectral-resolution imaging spectrometer (calorimeter), a grating spectrometer, a high timing resolution spectrometer, and a polarimeter.

Constellation-X
Constellation-X was early proposal that was superseded by IXO. It was to provide high resolution X-ray spectroscopy to probe matter as it falls into a black hole, as well as probe the nature of dark matter and dark energy by observing the formation of clusters of galaxies.

See also
X-ray telescope
List of X-ray space telescopes
X-Ray telescope articles
Balloons for X-ray astronomy

References

Satellites for X-ray astronomy
Astronomical imaging
Space telescopes
X-ray telescopes